Hymenostegia talbotii is a species of plant in the family Fabaceae. It is found only in Nigeria. It is threatened by habitat loss.

References

Detarioideae
Flora of Nigeria
Critically endangered plants
Taxonomy articles created by Polbot